Blas Chumacero Sánchez (January 18, 1905 in Puebla – July 12, 1997 in Mexico City) was a Mexican trade union leader and interim secretary general of the Confederation of Mexican Workers after Fidel Velásquez' death.

Chumacero Sánchez was the son of Zenón Chumacero Bueno and Josefa Sánchez Serrano. A high school dropout textile worker, he became a founding member of the General Confederation of Workers and Farmers of Mexico (CGOCM) in 1920 and a founding member of the Revolutionary Institutional Party (formerly, PNR). In 1936 he became a founding delegate of the Worker's Confederation of Mexico (CTM) and three years later he founded the Workers' Federation of Puebla, in which he served as secretary general for over 45 years.

Because of the strong (and usually coercive) ties between the Mexican labor movement and the government endorsed Revolutionary Institutional Party during most of the 20th century, Chumacero was elected once to the Congress of Puebla, six times to the Chamber of Deputies and twice to the Mexican senate; for a total of 33 years serving as legislator.

He was married to Aurelia Corona and adopted two siblings: Jaime and Rebeca Chumacero Lucio.

Source: Diccionario biográfico del gobierno mexicano, Ed. Fondo de Cultura Económica, Mexico, 1992.

External links
El Informador: Murió Blas Chumacero (in Spanish).

1905 births
1997 deaths
Mexican trade unionists
Members of the Chamber of Deputies (Mexico)
Presidents of the Chamber of Deputies (Mexico)
Members of the Senate of the Republic (Mexico)
Presidents of the Senate of the Republic (Mexico)
Institutional Revolutionary Party politicians
Politicians from Puebla
Members of the Congress of Puebla
Textile workers
20th-century Mexican politicians
People from Puebla (city)